Dougoutene II  is a rural commune of the Cercle of Koro in the Mopti Region of Mali. The commune contains 20 villages and in the 2009 census had a population of 20,115. The commune is administered from Andiagana-Na.

References

External links
.

Communes of Mopti Region